Events from the year 1536 in Ireland.

Incumbent
Lord: Henry VIII

Events
The Reformation Parliament meets in Dublin (until 1537).
Dissolution of the Monasteries:
Suppression of:
Baltinglass Abbey.
Bective Abbey (6 May).
Duiske Abbey, Graiguenamanagh.
Dunbrody Abbey (6 May).
Newtown Trim Cathedral Priory (1 May).
Hospital of St John the Evangelist, Cork.
St John's Priory Hospital, Waterford (granted to William Wise, November).
St Mary de Hogges Abbey, Dublin.
St. Wolstan's Priory (County Kildare; 15 September).
Tintern Abbey (County Wexford).
Friaries at Clonmel, Ennis and Galbally reformed.
Dromahair Friary burned.

Births

Deaths
 John FitzGerald, de facto 12th Earl of Desmond
 John mac Richard Mór Burke

References

 
1530s in Ireland
Ireland
Years of the 16th century in Ireland